Birgitta Bergvall-Kåreborn (born 18 February 1968) is a Swedish academic and professor of information systems. Since December 1, 2017 Bergvall-Kåreborn is the Vice-Chancellor at Luleå University of Technology.

Bergvall-Kåreborn defended her thesis ("A Multi-Modal Approach to Soft Systems Methodology") in 2002 at Luleå University of Technology. Since 2009 she is professor of information systems. She has also been the university's Pro Vice Chancellor.

References

1968 births
Living people
Academic staff of the Luleå University of Technology